Hossein Bashiriyeh, is an Iranian scholar in political theory and political sociology, who was born in 1953 in Hamedan, Iran.

Bashiriyeh has been described as the "Father of political sociology in Iran", and was a prominent academic figure influencing the Iranian reform movement.

He has a BA from the University of Tehran, an MA from Essex University and a PhD from Liverpool University, in Political Theories, he returned to Iran after the Islamic Revolution of 1979, and taught at several universities like Tehran University, Imam Sadegh University in Tehran and Bagherol-'Olum University in Qom. He resigned from Tehran University, where he was professor of political science. He is currently a professor of political science at the Maxwell School of Syracuse University.

Publications

Books

The State and Revolution in Iran, 1962–1982,St. Martin's Press, New York and Kent/Fyshwick: Croom Helm Ltd., 1984.
Revolution and Political Mobilization, Tehran university Press, 1992.
The Kingdom of Reason: 10 essays in political philosophy and political sociology, Tehran new science Press, 1993.
Political Sociology: The Role of Social Forces in Political Life, Tehran: Nay Publications 1996.
A History of Political thought in twentieth century (Marxism), Tehran, Nashr-e-Nay, 1999.
A history of Political thought in twentieth century (Liberal and Conservative Thought), Tehran, Nashr-e-Nay, 1999.
Twentieth Century Theories of Culture, Tehran, Ayandehpoyan publication, 2001.
Lessons on Democracy For Everyone, Tehran,  Negha-e-moaasar, 2001
An introduction to political sociology of Iran: the period of Islamic republic, Tehran, publication of Negha-e-moaasar, 2002.
Obstacles to political development in Iran, Tehran, publication of Gham-e-Noo, 2001.
Civil Society and Political Development in Iran. Tehran, Novin Press, 1998.
New Theories in Political Science. Tehran, Novin Press, 1999.
The Sociology of Modernity. Tehran: Naqdo Nazar, 1999.
The State and Civil Society: Discourses in Political Sociology. Tehran, Naqo Nazar, 2000.
Political Science For Everyone. Tehran: Negahe Moasser, 2001.
Reason in Politics: 35 Essays on Political Philosophy and Sociology. Tehran, Negahe Moasser, 2003.
Transition to Democracy:Theoretical Issues [Collection of Essays], Tehran, Negahe Moasser, 2006.

Translations from English into Persian
Barrington Moore's Social Origins of Dictatorship and Democracy (Tehran: Tehran University Press, 1990).
Andrew Vincent's Theories of the State (Tehran: Nay Press, 1991).
Richard Tuck's Hobbes (Tehran: Tarh-e Naw Press, 1995).
H. Dreyfus and P. Robinow's Michel Foucault: Beyond Structuralism and Hermeneutics. (Tehran: Nay Press, 1999).
Robert Holub's Jurgen Habermas: Critic in the Public Sphere (Tehran: Nay Press, 1996).
Thomas Hobbes's Leviathan (Tehran: Nay Press, 2001).
Von Baumer's (ed.) Main Currents of Western Thought (Tehran: Baaz Press, 2002).

Articles

Articles in English
“Society-State Relations in the Middle East: The Emergence of Civil Society,” Korea and the Middle East in a Changing World [Conference proceedings] (Seoul, 1996).
“Totalitarianism and Political Development in the USSR,” Iranian Journal of International Affairs, no. 2 (Fall 1990).
“From Dialectics to Dialogue: Reflections on Inter-civilizational Relations,” Journal of Global Dialogue (published in Cyprus), vol. 3 (Winter 2001).
“Civil Society and Democratization in Iran: Khatami’s Second Term,” Journal of Global Dialogue, vol.3 (Summer 2001).
“A Critical Examination of Reason in the Western and Islamic Philosophies,” Journal of Dialogue (published in Tehran) (Spring 2001).
Charismatic, Traditional and Legal Authority in Iran,” Political and International Quarterly (National University of Iran) (Spring 2003).
"The Crises of the Ideological States: The case of the Islamic Republic in Iran", Collection of Conference Articles, Korean Political Science Association, Seoul, S. Korea, 2005.
Role of Iranian Elite in Transition to Democracy

Articles in Persian
During the last 15 years he has published 35 articles in Persian language journals published in Iran. These essays have all been assembled in Reason in Politics: 35 Essays on Political Philosophy and Sociology (referred to above). These articles deal with the following topics: Reason in Politics; Main Concerns of Political Philosophy; Theories of Tolerance; Philosophy of Justice; New Liberalism; The Frankfurt School and Habermas;  The fate of Modernity; Ethical aspects of Art; Weber and Islam; Opposition in Democratic and Authoritarian Regimes; Consensus and Conflict; Anarchist Ideals in Political Development; Political Culture in the Pahlavi Period; Civil Society after the Revolution; Traditionalism as Counter-enlightenment in Iran; Class Struggles after the Revolution; Political Ideology and Identity-Building after the Revolution.

References

Iranian expatriate academics
Iranian political scientists
People from Hamadan
Academic staff of the University of Tehran
1953 births
Living people
Persian-language writers
20th-century Iranian historians